Simpson Creek may refer to:

Simpson Creek (Missouri), a stream in Ripley County, Missouri, United States
Simpson Creek (Niobrara River tributary), a stream in Keya Paha County, Nebraska
Simpson Creek (West Virginia), a tributary of the West Fork River in West Virginia, United States

See also
Simpson Branch (disambiguation)